Randel Huston "Randy" Parton (December 15, 1953 – January 21, 2021) was an American singer-songwriter, actor and businessman.

Life, career and death
Randy Parton was born in Sevierville, Tennessee, the eighth of twelve children born to Avie Lee Caroline (née Owens; 1923–2003) and Robert Lee Parton Sr. (1921–2000). He was the younger brother of Dolly and Stella Parton and the older brother of former actress Rachel Dennison.

Parton was the first person to record the song "Roll On (Eighteen Wheeler)" in 1982. Two years later, in 1984, the band Alabama recorded it, and became the group's 12th straight No. 1 single. Also in 1984, Parton sang a song for the Rhinestone soundtrack; his sister Dolly starred in the film. He also played bass for his sister.

Parton is also known for the theater that once bore his name in Roanoke Rapids, North Carolina. In 2007, he signed a deal worth over $1.5 million yearly to manage and perform in a new theater bearing his name in the Carolina Crossroads entertainment and shopping complex.

The relationship between Parton and the city soured as the theater struggled to attract customers and questions arose concerning Parton's use of a nearly $3 million fund for personal travel and entertainment. Parton was also questioned by city leaders for unauthorized events held at the theater including a wedding reception for his daughter along with details about who would be marketing the theater. Throughout the controversy, Parton maintained that his actions were within the contract and that the theater would be successful given time. Parton's contract with the city was terminated on January 8, 2008, and the theater was renamed the Roanoke Rapids Theater. The city took over the theater and in July 2012 voted to allow electronic gambling to help pay expenses and possibly attract a buyer.

Randy Parton died of cancer on January 21, 2021, at age 67.

Discography

Albums

Singles

Other album appearances

Notes
1.Parton provided backing vocals on this track.

References

External links

 
 Entry at 45cat.com

1953 births
2021 deaths
20th-century American businesspeople
20th-century American male actors
20th-century American male singers
20th-century American singers
21st-century American businesspeople
21st-century American male singers
21st-century American singers
American country singer-songwriters
American male film actors
American Pentecostals
Christians from Tennessee
People from Sevierville, Tennessee
Singer-songwriters from Tennessee
Deaths from cancer in North Carolina
American male singer-songwriters